The FIS Ski Flying World Ski Championships 1973 took place in Oberstdorf, West Germany between 8-10 March 1973. From 1973 to 1985, these championships would be held in odd-numbered years.

Individual

Medal table

References
 FIS Ski flying World Championships 1973 results. - accessed 25 November 2009.

FIS Ski Flying World Championships
1973 in ski jumping
1973 in West German sport
Ski jumping competitions in West Germany
International sports competitions hosted by Germany
1973 in Bavaria
Sports competitions in Bavaria
March 1973 sports events in Europe